The Corner House may refer to:
The Cornerhouse, Nottingham, a leisure complex in the UK
Cornerhouse, Manchester, a cinema and contemporary visual arts centre in the UK
Corner House (Johannesburg), a historic building in South Africa
 The Corner House (organisation), a not for profit organisation supporting democratic and community movements for environmental and social justice in the U.K.
 Corner House (Riga), the headquarters of the Soviet KGB in Latvia
 A house located in a Road intersection